Albia is a city in and the county seat of Monroe County, in southern Iowa, United States. The population was 3,721 at the 2020 census.

The city of Albia is known for its historic square and city-wide Victorian Architecture. Albia is also known for the annual "Restoration" days celebration which commemorates the refurbishment of the square and the town which began in the mid-1960s.

History

Albia was incorporated as a town in 1856. The town was named after Albia, New York, the former home of an early settler.

On Feb. 14, 1893, there was a coal mine explosion in the Chicago and Iowa mine, about 2.5 miles west of Albia. This room and pillar mine had opened around 1877. By the time of the explosion, mining extended more than 1,000 yards from the hoisting shaft, and the mine employed 60 miners and 20 other men. One miner was killed outright and seven died later of their injuries, after a "shot" (gunpowder charge used to bring down the coal) ignited a dust explosion in the mine. This was one of only two major mine disasters in Iowa between 1888 and 1913.

In the early 20th century, the region around Albia was dotted with coal mining camps and company towns. Of these, Buxton, 9 miles north of Albia, is the most widely studied. It had a large Black population. Other former coal camps in the area include Hiteman, Bluff Creek, Lockman, Coalfield, Hocking, and Hynes.

The growth in membership in the United Mine Workers union, as shown by the following data, is a useful measure of the importance of mining in the region. In 1902, UMW Locals 692 and 793 in Albia had an aggregate membership of 216. By 1912, UMW Locals 407, 782 and 793 in Albia had an aggregate membership of 338 (about 7.2% of the 1910 population).  Miners in Hiteman, 5 miles northwest of town, joined the UMWA in 1898; between 1902 and 1912, membership grew from 450 to 688. Miners in Hynes, 7 miles east, joined the UMWA in 1896; between 1902 and 1912, membership grew from 330 to 543.

Geography
Albia's longitude and latitude coordinates in decimal form are 41.026600, −92.805262.

Climate

According to the Köppen Climate Classification system, Albia has a hot-summer humid continental climate, abbreviated "Dfa" on climate maps.

Demographics

2010 census
As of the census of 2010, there were 3,766 people, 1,540 households, and 960 families living in the city. The racial makeup of the city was 97.5% White, 0.3% African American, 0.2% Native American, 0.3% Asian, 0.4% from other races, and 1.3% from two or more races. Hispanic or Latino of any race were 1.9% of the population.

There were 1,540 households, of which 30.6% had children under the age of 18 living with them, 45.3% were married couples living together, 11.4% had a female householder with no husband present, 5.7% had a male householder with no wife present, and 37.7% were non-families. 32.5% of all households were made up of individuals, and 15.6% had someone living alone who was 65 years of age or older. The average household size was 2.37 and the average family size was 2.98.

The median age in the city was 40 years. 25.1% of residents were under the age of 18; 8.1% were between the ages of 18 and 24; 22.5% were from 25 to 44; 24.5% were from 45 to 64; and 19.8% were 65 years of age or older. The gender makeup of the city was 48.5% male and 51.5% female.

2000 census
As of the census of 2000, there were 3,706 people, 1,531 households, and 943 families living in the city. The racial makeup of the city was 97.92% White, 0.32% African American, 0.32% Native American, 0.62% Asian, 0.24% from other races, and 0.57% from two or more races. Hispanic or Latino of any race were 0.84% of the population.

There were 1,531 households, out of which 29.8% had children under the age of 18 living with them, 46.8% were married couples living together, 11.5% had a female householder with no husband present, and 38.4% were non-families. 33.9% of all households were made up of individuals, and 19.2% had someone living alone who was 65 years of age or older. The average household size was 2.31 and the average family size was 2.97.

Age spread: 25.1% under the age of 18, 7.9% from 18 to 24, 24.2% from 25 to 44, 19.8% from 45 to 64, and 22.9% who were 65 years of age or older. The median age was 39 years. For every 100 females, there were 85.5 males. For every 100 females age 18 and over, there were 80.5 males.

The median income for a household in the city was $31,728, and the median income for a family was $41,607. Males had a median income of $33,025 versus $20,933 for females. The per capita income for the city was $16,843. About 4.3% of families and 9.2% of the population were below the poverty line, including 10.1% of those under age 18 and 4.7% of those age 65 or over.

Education
Albia Community School District operates public schools serving the community.

Activities
In Albia, there's the "Monroe Aquatic Center", "Washington Park", and the "City Park". The aquatic center has two water slides, low dive, high dive, children's area, basketball hoops above the water, and lockers. The city park includes a basketball court, a baseball field, a tennis court, and a playground with swings.

Notable people  

 George Bennard (1873–1958), composer of "The Old Rugged Cross"
 James W. Cattern (1867-1955), poet, privately printed volume of poetry Songs of Summer (1894).
 Nathan E. Kendall (1868–1936), politician and U.S. Representative from Iowa's 6th congressional district and the 23rd Governor of Iowa
 John Judge (born 1944), politician, served in the Iowa State Senate
 Patty Judge (born 1943), politician, served Iowa as State Senator, Iowa Secretary of Agriculture, and Lieutenant Governor of Iowa

 Johnny Miler, né Miletich (1910–1976) Boxer, 1932 Summer Olympics. Defeated Joe Louis in amateur bout
 Wendell Nedderman (1921-2019), college administrator, president of The University of Texas at Arlington from 1972 to 1992
 James Stevens (1892–1971), musician and writer, most notably Paul Bunyan
 Fred Townsend (1862–1918), politician and Iowa legislator, football player
 Josiah T. Young (1831-1907), politician - Iowa Secretary of State, legislator and newspaper editor; mayor of Albia
 Theodore Bolivar Perry, politician

References

External links

 
 Albia Chamber of Commerce
 Albia school district website

 
Cities in Iowa
Cities in Monroe County, Iowa
County seats in Iowa